The 2022 Swedish Golf Tour, titled as the 2022 MoreGolf Mastercard Tour for sponsorship reasons, was the 39th season of the Swedish Golf Tour, a series of professional golf tournaments held in Sweden and Norway with a winter series in Spain.

All tournaments also featured on the 2022 Nordic Golf League.

Schedule
The following table lists official events during the 2022 season.

Order of Merit
The Order of Merit was titled as the MoreGolf Mastercard Tour Ranking and was based on prize money won during the season, calculated using a points-based system.

See also
2022 Danish Golf Tour
2022 Swedish Golf Tour (women)

Notes

References

Swedish Golf Tour
Swedish Golf Tour